European route E 84 is a road part of the International E-road network. It begins in İpsala border gate (to/from Greece) in Turkey and run through Keşan, Malkara, Tekirdağ and Marmaraereğlisi and ends in Silivri, Turkey.

The road follows: Keşan - Tekirdağ - Silivri. It is a part of the D-110.

Route 

: Keşan - Tekirdağ - Silivri

External links 
 UN Economic Commission for Europe: Overall Map of E-road Network (2007)

84
E084